Carl Adam Johann Nepomuk Zeller (19 June 1842 – 17 August 1898) was an Austrian composer of operettas.

Zeller was born in Sankt Peter in der Au, the only child of physician Johann Zeller and Maria Anna Elizabeth. Zeller's father died before his first birthday, after which his mother remarried Ernest Friedinger. In 1875, Zeller married Anna Maria Schwetz.

Zeller had a fine soprano voice, and sang in the Vienna Boys' Choir before studying and composition in the University of Vienna. He worked as a civil servant at the Imperial Ministry of Education  while composing choral works and a number of operettas, the best-known of which is Der Vogelhändler.

Legal troubles, including a perjury conviction, ended Zeller's career at the ministry and led to prison and public disgrace in the mid-1890s (although his prison sentence was later repealed). After an injury in 1895 from falling on the ice, he spent his last years physically and then mentally ill.  Zeller died of pneumonia in Baden bei Wien at the age of 56.

Operettas
Joconde (1876)
Die Fornarina (1878)
Capitän Nicoll, oder Die Carbonari (1880)
Der Vagabund (1886)
Der Vogelhändler (The Bird Seller) (1891)
The Mine Foreman (Der Obersteiger) (1894)
''Der Kellermeister (1901; completed by Johannes Brandl)

External links
Biography of Zeller
Zeller at the Johann Strauss Society of Great Britain
List of Zeller's stage works
Brief profile of Zeller
More complete German Wikipedia entry

References

1842 births
1898 deaths
Composers from Vienna
Austrian Romantic composers
Austrian opera composers
Male opera composers
19th-century classical composers
Austrian male classical composers
Deaths from pneumonia in Austria
19th-century male musicians
19th-century musicians